The Girl on the Late, Late Show is a 1974 American TV film directed by Gary Nelson. It was designed as a pilot of a weekly TV series starring Don Murray.

Plot
A man tries to track down an old screen star.

Cast
Don Murray as William Martin
Bert Convy as F J Allen
Yvonne De Carlo as Lorraine
Gloria Grahame as Carolyn Parker
Van Johnson as Johnny Leverett
Ralph Meeker as Inspector Debiesse
Cameron Mitchell as Norman Wilder
Mary Ann Mobley as Librarian
Joe Santos as Sergeant Scott
Laraine Stephens as Paula
John Ireland as Bruno Walters
Walter Pidgeon as John Pahlman
Sherry Jackson as Pat Clauson
Felice Orlandi as Detective

References

External links

1974 television films
1974 films
American television films
Television films as pilots
Television pilots not picked up as a series
Films directed by Gary Nelson